Manuel Añorve Baños (born 15 May 1957) is a Mexican politician affiliated with the Institutional Revolutionary Party (PRI). He serves as a senator of the LXIV Legislature of the Mexican Congress, representing the state of Guerrero. He also is a two-time federal deputy and two-time former mayor of Acapulco.

Life

Añorve was born in Ometepec, Guerrero, Mexico, on 15 May 1957. Añorve graduated with his law degree from the National Autonomous University of Mexico (UNAM) in 1981; he would later return to the university to obtain his master's and doctoral degrees. He was the private secretary to the head of the Secretariat of Agrarian Reform from 1981 to 1982. After several years spent earning more degrees, writing a book titled Los Servicios Públicos Municipales (Municipal Public Services), and becoming a state political councilor for the PRI, Añorve returned to the federal government in 1991 as the representative of Banobras in Guerrero. In 1993, he became a city councilor in Acapulco, simultaneously heading up the city's water and sewer commission and serving as the secretary general of the municipal PRI organization there.

In 1996, Añorve was named as the state secretary of finances and administration. A year later, however, Hurricane Pauline slammed into Acapulco and prompted a municipal political crisis that concluded with the resignation of the city's municipal president, Juan Salgado Tenorio. Interim Governor Ángel Aguirre Rivero selected Añorve, his cousin, as the interim municipal president of Acapulco, filling the remaining two years of Tenorio's term. With his term expired, in 1999, Añorve became a state deputy, cutting that term short in order to become a federal deputy in the LVIII Legislature. He was among the PRI's highest ranking officials, becoming the secretary of the board of directors of the Permanent Commission, along with three normal commission assignments.

Añorve resurfaced in 2006 as the coordinator of advisors to the PRI caucus in the Senate. He left that job to run again for mayor of Acapulco, winning a second term and serving from 2009 to 2012. While serving as municipal president, he ran for Governor of Guerrero in 2010.

The PRI named Añorve a proportional representation deputy from the fourth region to the LXII Legislature, in which he served between 2012 and 2015. He presided over the Administration Committee and special commission commemorating the bicentennial of the Congreso de Anáhuac and the Sentimientos de la Nación, and he held secretarial posts on three commissions—National Defense, Jurisdictional, and Oversight of the Supreme Auditor of the Federation—along with two other regular assignments. Añorve made another bid for the PRI gubernatorial nomination in 2015, but the party chose Héctor Astudillo Flores instead.

In 2018, Añorve ran for Senate as the Todos por México coalition candidate; the ticket finished second, sending him to the legislature as the first minority senator.

See also
 List of mayors of Acapulco

References

1957 births
Living people
Politicians from Guerrero
Members of the Chamber of Deputies (Mexico) for Guerrero
Institutional Revolutionary Party politicians
21st-century Mexican politicians
National Autonomous University of Mexico alumni
Members of the Congress of Guerrero
Municipal presidents in Guerrero
20th-century Mexican politicians
Members of the Senate of the Republic (Mexico) for Guerrero
Senators of the LXIV and LXV Legislatures of Mexico
Deputies of the LXII Legislature of Mexico
Deputies of the LVIII Legislature of Mexico